Schinnen is a village and a former municipality in the province of Limburg, the Netherlands.  It is home to US Army Garrison Schinnen, a support base for US personnel assigned to nearby Allied Joint Force Command Brunssum.  It is also the location of Alfa Brewery, the only brewery in the Netherlands that uses an officially certified underground spring. In 2019, it merged with Nuth and Onderbanken to form Beekdaelen.

Cities and towns
Amstenrade
Doenrade
Oirsbeek
Puth
Schinnen
Sweikhuizen

Topography

Dutch topographic map of the municipality of Schinnen, June 2015

Notable people 
 Hans Erkens (born 1952), AFC Ajax footballer
 Frans Körver (born 1937), footballer
 Henk van der Linden (1925–2021), film director
 G. M. Nijssen (born 1938), computer scientist
 Henri Ritzen (1892–1976), painter
 Theo Rutten (1899–1980), politician and minister

References

External links

Beekdaelen
South Limburg (Netherlands)
Former municipalities of Limburg (Netherlands)
Populated places in Limburg (Netherlands)
Municipalities of the Netherlands disestablished in 2019